SonyLIV is an Indian over-the-top freemium streaming platform owned by Culver Max Entertainment. SonyLIV was introduced in 2013 as the first OTT service in India. As a streaming service, it carries content from its local networks, including films, television series, live sports matches and original programming, and also features content licensed from third-parties in India such as Lionsgate and ITV among others. Since 2020, SonyLIV has taken more of an active role as a producer and distributor for both films and television series, offering original programming content through its online library.

History
SonyLIV was launched on 23 January 2013, by Culver Max Entertainment.

Today, the platform has access to 18 years of content from channels that are part of Culver Max Entertainment and more than 700 movies, which means a total of 40,000+ hours of television show coverage in Hindi and English. Since its launch, SonyLIV has streamed live sports events.

Varieties of anime originals from Animax were available on SonyLIV to stream. After shutting down a linear TV channel on 18 April 2017, Animax was made available exclusively as a digital streaming channel in India from 7 July 2017 to 7 May 2020.

In June 2020, SonyLIV was launched as a streaming service in the United States on Sling TV, streaming all the shows available in India on the app.

Sony LIV was launched in Canada on 14th Oct 2021.

LIV Sports 
LIV Sports was launched on 1 June 2014 by Culver Max Entertainment (as a new sports streaming service exclusively for sports properties).
LIV Sports was the official mobile and internet broadcaster for the 2014 FIFA World Cup starting 12 June 2014. LIV Sports aired both live and video-on-demand match content with statistics and analysis. However, this service was integrated into SonyLIV. Since then, LIV Sports has been a part of Sony LIV.

Sony LIV first revamp (2016)

Sony LIV underwent its first revamp and started to stream live television channels. Since then, Sony LIV has added many shows and movies to its portfolio. On 1 November 2018, Sony LIV and Lionsgate entered a multi-year content[ deal. As part of the deal, Sony LIV will offer an embedded Lionsgate Play with over 500 hours of premium-original series on its platform. In 2019, Sony LIV started to stream live channels of other networks, including news channels.

Sony LIV second revamp (2020)

Sony LIV revamped its content and interface in May 2020 using AWS Cloud. Sony LIV uses Amazon ElastiCache to support real-time, in-memory caching at scale, Amazon CloudFront as a low-latency content delivery network, and Amazon Simple Queue Service (Amazon SQS) as a highly available message queuing service. In June 2020, Sony LIV underwent a revamp for the second time, and this time they started to stream content from Sony Pictures Entertainment, Sony Pictures Television Studios, ITV and Reliance Entertainment. Also, SonyLIV started to stream its own original movies and series. 
On 15 January 2021, WWE Network was launched in India through Sony LIV.

Overview 
SonyLIV is the first Indian over-the-top media service platform to produce music content for a Hollywood feature film – producing music for the Hindi version of the blockbuster titled Passengers, starring Chris Pratt and Jennifer Lawrence. The singers for the original soundtrack titled Aadat included Jubin Nautiyal, Shirley Setia and Raftaar. Since then SonyLIV has produced more than 100 songs which are now available on the app, YouTube, JioSaavn and many other online music service platforms worldwide.

Programming 
SonyLIV's core library consists of 18 years of content from Culver Max Entertainment's channels including Sony TV, Sony SAB, Sony Aath and Sony Marathi. 

After Sony Pictures Networks India's acquisition of Ten Sports Network, all TEN Sports live programs became part of its broadcast. Since then, SonyLIV has been streaming WWE Raw, WWE SmackDown and other WWE pay-per-view events, and UFC. SonyLIV also streamed cricket matches played by Pakistan, Australia, Sri Lanka, South Africa, West Indies and Zimbabwe, and Grand Prix motorcycle racing.

Until early 2021, it also streamed the National Basketball Association.

Genres 
Sony LIV features programming in the following key genres: comedy, crime, drama, horror and action.

Live channels 
Sony LIV also live streams its own channels in its network on the platform.

Sony LIV Originals 
Sony LIV has streamed a number of original streaming television series. The first-ever original was a Gujarati web series titled Kacho Papad Pako Papad  and it is streaming since 2017.

Sony LIV underwent a revamp in its appearance in June 2020. Since then, Sony LIV provides their original shows in 5–7 languages. Other than Hindi, Sony LIV releases originals in the other languages after 1–2 weeks from the release date.

Rocket Boys, Scam 1992, Maharani, Avrodh: The Siege Within, Chutzpah, Undekhi, and Tanaav are some of the popular Sony LIV original shows.

Availability 
Sony LIV is available in India, Pakistan, UAE, Qatar, Kuwait, Saudi Arabia, Oman, Bahrain, Bangladesh, Nepal, Sri Lanka, Maldives, Bhutan, Afghanistan, Malaysia, Singapore, Hong Kong, Macau, China, Taiwan, Australia, New Zealand, Philippines, Indonesia, Thailand, Germany, Switzerland, Norway, Netherlands, Spain, France, United Kingdom, Italy, Portugal, Ireland, Austria, Sweden, Belgium, Denmark, Finland, Greece, Poland and Canada. It’s also available in the United States via Sling TV.

Viewership 
SonyLIV has reached about 25 million views on a monthly basis on its website, app and YouTube channel.

Platforms

Hardware supported 
List of Sony LIV-ready devices:
 Sony Bravia smart TVs and Sony Xperia smartphones
 Android TV devices
 Samsung smart TVs
 Amazon Fire TV and Fire HD devices
 Roku devices
 Apple TV
 Chromecast devices

Software supported 
Supported web browsers by platform:
 KaiOS: Available in JioPhone, installable through JioStore.
 OS X: An Intel-based or Apple Silicone Mac with OS 10.4.8 or later. Browsers supported are Safari 4 (or higher), Firefox 5 (or higher) and Google Chrome.
 Microsoft Windows: Windows XP Service Pack 2, Windows Vista, Windows 7 running Internet Explorer 8 (or higher), Firefox 2 (or higher) or Google Chrome 6 (or higher), and Windows 8.1 through a web browser.

Other software options
 Android version 2.2 and above
 iOS, iPad, iPhone and iPod Touch
 Windows Phone

Sony LIV security flaw 
On 20 December 2019, Bengaluru-based security researcher Ehraz Ahmed discovered a security flaw in the Sony LIV app, that allowed to fetch sensitive user information such as profile picture, email address, date of birth, name and phone number of its registered users.

See also 
 Culver Max Entertainment
 List of SonyLIV original programming
 ZEE5
 Crunchyroll
 Wakanim
 VRV
 Anime on Demand
 Crackle
 Hooq

Notes

References

External links

Sony Pictures Entertainment
Sony Pictures Television
Subscription video on demand services
Video on demand services
Indian entertainment websites
Internet television channels
Sony Pictures Networks India
2013 establishments in Maharashtra
Mass media companies established in 2013